Calvin Taylor may refer to:
 Calvin B. Taylor (1857–1932), American banker, lawyer, educator and politician
 Calvin Howard Taylor (1896–19??), politician in Ontario, Canada
 Calvin Taylor, a character on the New Zealand soap opera Shortland Street